Venus in the Cloister or The Nun in her Smock, known in the original French as  Vénus dans le cloître, ou la Religieuse en chemise (1683) is a work of erotic fiction by the Abbé du Prat, which is a pseudonym for an unknown author. Candidates for whom this might be include Jean Barrin (1640 in Rennes – 7/9/1718 in Nantes) and François de Chavigny de La Bretonnière.

Content
The book is an example of the whore dialogue genre. In it, a series of dramatic conversations between two fictional nuns (Sister Agnès, aged 16, and Sister Angélique, aged 19) are related. In these conversations, the elder more experienced woman instructs the younger about sex. The first edition of 1683 has three dialogues, increased to five in 1702 and six in 1719. In the last of these two new characters—Virginie and Seraphique—are introduced as the interlocutors of the sixth dialogue.

Synopsis
Venus in the Cloister is made up of five dialogues, all of them carried out between Sister Agnes and Sister Angelica. The entire story can be considered as a “whore dialogue” in which the elder nun trains the younger one in matters of sex. Sister Angelica is the older and more experienced nun who had come to the convent at the age of thirteen. She has been a part of the House for almost seven years now while Sister Agnes is younger and new to the place.

The dialogue begins when Sister Agnes is caught in the act of masturbating by the older and wiser nun Sister Angelica. She is embarrassed and taken aback while Sister Angelica appears to be quite unaffected by what she has just witnessed.

What follows is an attempt by Sister Angelica to seduce the younger nun. Sister Agnes is discomfited to have been caught by the older nun and so she meekly protests against Sister Angelica's sexual attempts.

However, Angelica knows that her seduction will remain incomplete if the younger nun's philosophical thought process remains unchanged. So she promises Agnes teachings of a new kind of religion in which there is little room for self-denial and more scope for “informed Judgment”. Angelica then proceeds to mention Reverend Father Jesuit, who helped open her mind to such new types of religious speculations and debate. The father talks of religion in terms of two distinct bodies—"one of which is purely celestial and supernatural, the other terrestrial and corruptible, which is only the invention of Men". The second body is termed as Policy which tends to destroy inner peace.

Angelica decides to explore the different designs of the “Policy” in putting up such elaborate rules to be followed. The following speech on Policy given by Sister Angelica becomes essential in establishing the sex scenes that follow.

What follows is a process of exploration of the sexual desires of both the nuns. While Angelica imparts her knowledge, Sister Agnes carefully acts the part of the younger nun who tries to escape seduction but fails in the attempt. Agnes submits to being in a sense of "Confusion" and she is embarrassed to let the older nun see her body. This also relates to the fact that Agnes has not completely accepted the religious and philosophical deliberations of the older nun. Gradually as she starts accepting the truth of her own body and sexuality she will finally be free from her old biases.

Themes

Whore dialogue
Venus in the Cloister is considered to be a whore dialogue. This form of writing began with Pietro Aretino's Ragionamenti (1534–36) followed by such works as La Retorica delle Puttane (The Whore's Rhetoric) (1642) by Ferrante Pallavicino; L'École des Filles (The School for Girls) (1655), attributed to Michel Millot and Jean L'Ange and also known as The School of Venus; The Dialogues of Luisa Sigea (c. 1660) by Nicolas Chorier (known also as A Dialogue between a Married Woman and a Maid in various editions; and as "Satyra sotadica"). Such works typically concerned the sexual education of a naive younger woman by an experienced older woman and often included elements of philosophising, satire and anti-clericalism. In such stories, dramatic dialogues are exchanged between an older experienced woman and a younger woman.

In Venus in the Cloister, acts of masturbation, flagellation, same sex sexuality, voyeurism and copulation are explored in detail. Initially the work contained three dialogues but in later editions more were added. Sadomasochism is explored and there is a deliberate attempt to describe sexual acts in graphic detail.

The theme of female intimacy is explored in great detail in the work as Sister Agnes and Sister Angelica engage in acts of sexuality. The convent was considered to provide a repressive environment where such sexual relations between nuns were considered to be quite common. This oppressive setting of the church and subsequent lesbian relations that developed as a result was a popular theme in literature during the reforms of Protestantism and Counter-Reformation. Denis Diderot's La Religieuse is a later example of this theme.

Religious repression
The author of Venus in the Cloister satirizes the constraints of convent life which expected nuns to live in a "cloister" of sexual repression and suffering and the use by the state of religious ideology as a means of control. Sex becomes the only means of protest against such rigorous controls of the state. A careful parallel is drawn between the act of sexual pleasure and protesting against repressive state control. "At the moment of orgasm, individuality triumphs over the collective, nature acts out against culture and freedom strikes a blow against tyranny.

Gradually through the dialogues, Agnes begins to see Sister Angelica's viewpoint and embraces her doctrines, she is freed from the sense of prejudice that she starts out with at the beginning of the book. The author attempts to attack the Church and its policies by creating an erotic setting with a convent. Secret meetings, acts of voyeurism, presence of veils and observers all combine to make the narrative extremely erotic and critical of repressive practices at the same time.

Publication history

French editions
A similar work in a similar setting with four more characters called: Les Délices du cloître, ou la Religieuse éclairée has often been included with editions of Vénus dans le cloître—to the considerable confusion of bibliographers and editors.  Pierre Gandon illustrated an edition in 1962: Vénus dans le cloître, ou La religieuse en chemise de l'Abbé Du Prat (Le coffret du bibliophile.) Paris: Livre du Bibliophile, 1962.

English editions
An anonymous translation was published in London in 1683, the year of the original French edition, by the bookseller Henry Rhodes, Fleet Street.

Another translation by Robert Samber was published in London in October 1724, not without its fair share of controversy. Its publication is attributed to Edmund Curll (1675–1747), a popular and quite interesting figure of 18th century London. He was notoriously reputed for championing the cause of experimental books that focused on themes of sexuality. Even though Edmund Curll ensured that his name was not mentioned in the title page of Robert Samber’s translation, it did not prevent him from running into trouble. Curll began to face problems right after the publication of this book and was arrested twice in 1725 and then again in 1727. He became the first person in England to be convicted on charge of obscenity under the common law.

William James Thoms, Edmund Curll’s biographer, recorded the proceedings of the trial. There appears to be a confusion in understanding the chronology of the trial because Thoms claims that Venus in the Cloister was only one of the three publications for which he was sent to trial, and perhaps not the most important one either.

Edmund Curll’s arrest was not just an action directed against Curll the individual but also the types of books he usually published. A report in The Whitehall Evening Post, claims that Lord Townshend was responsible for having Edmund Curll arrested in 1725 because he published "obscene Books and Pamphlets, tending to encourage Vice and Immorality".

Edmund Curll had relevant arguments against Townshend's attack. Venus in the Cloister was a translation which had not attracted any legal action when it first appeared on print. Moreover, Edmund Curll argued that, Jean Barrin's work was meant to be read as a satire attacking the injustices of the Church. Even A Treatise of the Use of Flogging in Venerial Affairs had been published before its translation without any legal intervention. The argument was quite valid and in favor of Edmund Curll but his luck was short lived. While Townshend fretted over how to convict Curll, John Ker appeared on the scene. Edmund Curll had met John Ker in jail—he was an old man with quite an adventurous history and conveniently enough for Curll, he had just finished writing his memoirs which was also quite libelous. When Curll published Memoirs of John Ker, Townshend found enough reason to send him behind bars once again, and this time with plenty of legal reason.

In 1727 the King's Bench declared that selling any kind of sexually explicit literature was an act of misdemeanor. In 1728, three years after his first arrest Curll's sentence was pronounced. He had to pay, by way of fine, 25 marks each for Venus in the Cloister and A Treatise of the Use of Flogging and 20 marks for the memoirs. More significantly he was asked to stand for an hour on the pillory at Charing Cross. “At the end of the hour, during which nothing more actually occurred, Curll was hoisted up on the shoulders of a couple of his strongest supporters and taken off to a nearby pub for a few pints.”

This appears to be the first conviction for obscenity in the United Kingdom, and set a legal precedent for other convictions until the Obscene Publications Act 1959.

Notes

References
John Cleland Fanny Hill, or, Memoirs of a Woman of Pleasure. (Penguin Popular Classics). London: Penguin Books, 1985
Maurice Couturier, Textual Communication: a print-based theory of the novel, Routledge, 1991 
Thomas A. Foster, Long before Stonewall: histories of same-sex sexuality in early America, New York: NYU Press, 2007 
David Fairweather Foxon, Libertine Literature in England, 1660-1745 (A Library of Ancient and Modern Classics.) University Books, 1965
Eliza Fowler Haywood, Fantomina and Other Works; edited by Alexander Pettit, Margaret Case Croskery, and Anna C. Patchias. (Broadview Literary Texts). Peterborough, Ont.: Broadview Press, 2004 
Patrick J. Kearney,  A History of Erotic Literature. London: Macmillan; 1982
Phyllis & Eberhard Kronhausen, Erotic Fantasies: a study of the sexual imagination. New York: Grove Press; 1969
Clare A. Lyons, Sex Among the Rabble: an intimate history of gender & power in the Age of Revolution; Philadelphia, 1730–1830, Chapel Hill: University of North Carolina Press, 2006
Ian McCormick, Secret Sexualities: a sourcebook of 17th and 18th century writing, Routledge, 1997 
Bradford Keyes Mudge, When Flesh Becomes Word: an anthology of early eighteenth-century libertine literature, New York: Oxford University Press, 2004 
Bradford Keyes Mudge, The Whore’s Story: women, pornography and the British novel, 1684–1830. New York: Oxford University Press, 2000
Roger Thompson, Unfit for Modest Ears: a study of pornographic, obscene, and bawdy works written or published in England in the second half of the seventeenth century. Totowa: Rowman and Littlefield, 1979, 
Sarah Toulalan, Imagining Sex: pornography and bodies in seventeenth-century England, Oxford: Oxford University Press, 2007  (Based on her University of London Ph.D. thesis, 2002)
Elizabeth Susan Wahl, Invisible Relations: representations of female intimacy in the Age of Enlightenment. Stanford: Stanford University Press, 1999 

French erotic novels
17th-century French novels
Censorship in the United Kingdom
Works published under a pseudonym
1683 novels
Nuns in fiction